Maleme Airport is an airport situated at Maleme, Crete. It has two runways (13/31 and 03/21) with no lights. The airport has closed for commercial aviation, but the Chania Aeroclub continues to use it.

The airport operated until 1959 as the main public airport of Chania.  the Hellenic Air Force makes limited use of the facility.

Maleme Airport became a historic World War II site when many German parachutists and mountain troops landed there in May 1941 as part of the Battle of Crete.

See also
List of airports in Crete

References

External links
 Maleme at Battlefield Review
 Maleme at Forgotten Airfields
 The Battle of Maleme at Hellenic Foundation

Airports in Greece
Battle of Crete
Buildings and structures in Chania (regional unit)
Hellenic Air Force bases
Airports in Crete